Platner is an unincorporated community in Washington County, Colorado, United States.  The U.S. Post Office at Otis (ZIP Code 80743) now serves Platner postal addresses.

Geography
Platner is located at  (40.1552603,-103.0674384).

References

Unincorporated communities in Washington County, Colorado
Unincorporated communities in Colorado